The Miss Hawaii World competition is a beauty pageant that selects the representative for the state of Hawaii in the Miss World America pageant.

The current Miss Hawaii World is Angela Hilario.

Gallery of titleholders

Winners 
Color key

Notes to table

References

External links

Hawaii culture
Women in Hawaii
Hawaii
Recurring events established in 1959
1959 establishments in Hawaii